John Charles Roper (1858 – 26 January 1940) was an Anglican bishop in the Anglo-Catholic tradition in the first half of the 20th century.

Biography
Roper was educated at Keble College, Oxford.

Ordained in 1882, he began his ministry with a curacy at Herstmonceux and was then as chaplain of Brasenose College, Oxford.

In 1886, he was appointed Professor of Divinity at Trinity College, Toronto and also served as parish priest of St Thomas's Toronto. He was then Professor of Theology at the  General Theological Seminary, New York City In 1912 he became the third Bishop of British Columbia and was translated to be the Bishop of Ottawa three years later, serving for 24 years - the last six as the Metropolitan of Ontario.

References 

 

1858 births
1940 deaths
Anglican bishops of British Columbia
Anglican bishops of Ottawa
Metropolitans of Ontario
Alumni of Keble College, Oxford
Academic staff of the University of Toronto
Anglo-Catholic bishops
20th-century Anglican Church of Canada bishops
20th-century Anglican archbishops
Canadian Anglo-Catholics
General Theological Seminary faculty